The Unbearable Lightness of Inspector Fan, also known as Shanghai Noir, is a 2015 comedy action romance suspense film directed by Clara Law. The film is a Chinese-Hong Kong co-production.

The film was lensed by noted director of photography, Sion Michel.

It was released on January 16, 2015.

Cast
Ethan Juan
Zhou Dongyu
Yang Zishan
Yang Yang
Jack Kao
Zhao Lixin 
Jin Song 
Zhang Jingjing 
Liu Yiwei 
Du Haitao
Guo Qiucheng

Reception
By January 25, 2015, the film had earned US$3.74 million at the Chinese box office.

References

External links

Chinese suspense films
Chinese action comedy films
Films directed by Clara Law
Hong Kong action comedy films
2015 romantic comedy films
2015 action comedy films
2010s Hong Kong films
Hong Kong romantic comedy films